Sporting Union Agen Lot-et-Garonne, commonly referred to as SU Agen, Agen or SUALG, is a French professional rugby union club based in Agen, Lot-et-Garonne that competes in the Pro D2, France's second division of rugby.

Founded in 1908, Agen is one of the historic clubs in French rugby, having won the French Championship eight times. Its home ground is the 10,512-seat Stade Armandie and traditional club colours are navy blue and white. 

The club is renowned for its youth system and its academy structure.

History
The club was established in 1900. They made their first championship final in the 1930 season, where they met US Quillan, and defeated them 4 points to nil in Bordeaux, and thus capturing their first championship title. The club experienced some success in the coming years in the Challenge Yves du Manoir competition as well; winning it in the 1932 season and then becoming runners-up to Lyon OU in the 1933 season.

Agen would have another successful run in the 1940s, beginning with the 1943 season when they defeated Stade Bordelais 11 to 4 to win the Coupe de France. That season they also made it to the championship final; though they were defeated by Aviron Bayonnais 3 points to nil at Parc des Princes in Paris.

In 1945 they again won the title of the French championship, defeating FC Lourdes 7 points to 3 in the final in Paris. The championship was one of two titles that season, as Agen also won the Coupe de France, defeating Montferrand 14 to 13. Agen featured in one more championship that decade, losing to Toulouse 10 points to 3.

Agen were relatively quiet during the 1950s, though they again rose to prominence during the 1960s. In 1962 they again became of the champions of France after defeating Béziers 14 points to 11 in the season final. The following season they won the Challenge Yves du Manoir, defeating Brive 11 points to nil in the final. Agen became the French champions on two more occasions during the 1960s, defeating Brive in 1965 and then Dax in 1966.

The club had another successful run during the 1970s, starting with an unsuccessful Challenge Yves du Manoir final, losing to Toulon 25 points to 22. They were unsuccessful again in 1975 in the Challenge Yves du Manoir, losing to Béziers 16 points to 12 in the final. However they would then meet Béziers in the championship final of the 1976 season, and defeat them  13 to 10 to win their first championship since 1966.

Agen went through period of success in the 1980s after winning the championship in 1982, defeating Aviron Bayonnais 18 points to 9 in the final. The following season they won the Challenge Yves du Manoir as well after defeating Toulon 29 points to 7. In 1984 they again contested the championship final, though they eventually lost it to Béziers. They unsuccessfully contested it again in 1986, losing to Toulouse 16 to 6. They were also runners-up in the 1987 Challenge Yves du Manoir, losing to Grenoble. However, in 1988 they again won the championship, defeating Stadoceste Tarbais 9 to 3 in the final.

They contested the final again in the 1990 season, losing to Racing Club de France 22 points to 12. In 1992 they won the Challenge Yves du Manoir, defeating RC Narbonne 23 to 18.

Professional era
In 1998 they played in their first European cup final, the European Challenge Cup, losing to fellow French team US Colomiers 43 to 5 in the final. On June 8, 2002 they lost to Biarritz Olympique in the championship final.

In recent years, one of their biggest stars has been Fijian winger Rupeni Caucaunibuca. He led the team in tries in 2005 and 2006, and led Pro D2 in that category during Agen's most recent promotion season in 2010. However, he would be dismissed from the team in September 2010 after failing to report to the team for preseason workouts (several weeks later, he would reemerge at Toulouse).

Honours
 French championship:
 Champions: 1930, 1945, 1962, 1965, 1966, 1976, 1982, 1988
 Runners-up: 1943, 1947, 1984, 1986, 1990, 2002
 Challenge Yves du Manoir:
 Champions: 1932, 1963, 1983, 1992
 Runners-up: 1933, 1970, 1975, 1987
 Coupe de France:
 Champions: 1943, 1945
 European Challenge Cup:
 Runners-up: 1998
 Challenge Armand Vaquerin:
 Champions: 1999
 Pro D2:
 Champions: 2010
 Promotion playoff winners: 2015, 2017

Finals results

Finals results

Challenge Yves du Manoir

Coupe de France

European Shield

Pro D2 promotion playoffs

Current standings

Current squad

The Agen squad for the 2022–23 season is:

Espoirs squad

Notable former players

 
  Belisario Agulla
  Eusebio Guiñazú
  Omar Hasan
  Scott Daruda
  Junior Pelesasa
  Colin Yukes
  Jason Marshall
  Sergio Valdes
  Silvère Tian
  Andrew Springgay
  Rupeni Caucaunibuca
  Osea Kolinisau
  Taniela Rawaqa
  Saïmoni Vaka
  Mathieu Barrau
  Guy Basquet
  Jean-Paul Baux
  Christian Béguerie
  Jean-Baptiste Bédère
  Abdelatif Benazzi
  René Bénésis
  Philippe Benetton
  Pierre Berbizier
  Philippe Bérot
  Paul Biémouret
  Sébastien Bonetti
  Jean Boubée
  Guillaume Bouic
  Christian Califano
  Olivier Campan
  Georges Carabignac
  Jean Clavé
  Valentin Courrent
  David Couzinet
  Jean-François Coux
  Jean-Jacques Crenca
  Marc Dal Maso
  Jean-Louis Dehez
  Christian Delage
  Daniel Dubroca
  Yves Duffaut
  Brice Dulin
  Jean-Louis Dupont
  Sylvain Dupuy
  Louis Echave
  Pépito Elhorga
  Dominique Erbani
  Albert Ferrasse
  Jacques Fort
  François Gelez
  Éric Gleyze 
  Jacques Gratton
  Pierre Guilleux
  Marius Guiral
  Francis Haget
  Cédric Heymans
  Jean-Claude Hiquet
  Thierry Labrousse
  Bernard Lacombe
  Pierre Lacroix
  Luc Lafforgue
  Christophe Lamaison
  Grégoire Lascubé
  Michel Lasserre
  Serge Lassoujade
  Marcel Laurent
  Bernard Lavigne
  Joël Llop
  Matthieu Lièvremont
  Gérard Magnac
  Jean-Claude Malbet
  Christophe Manas
  Jean Matheu-Cambas
  Jean-Michel Mazas
  Patrick Mazzer
  Jérôme Miquel
  Jean Monribot
  Christophe Porcu
  Olivier Sarraméa
  Philippe Sella
  Michel Sitjar
  Laurent Seigne
  Jean-Louis Tolot
  Bruno Tolot
  Max Vigerie
  Bernard Viviès
  Irakli Machkhaneli
  Giorgi Nemsadze
  Anton Peikrishvili
  Konstantin Mikautadze
  Beka Sheklashvili
  Denis Fogarty
  Santiago Dellapè
  Alessio Galasso
  Aaron Persico
  Francesco Zani
 Djalil Narjissi
  Ben Blair
  Richard Fromont
  Billy Fulton
  Kees Meeuws
  John Schwalger
  Sorin Socol
  Adri Badenhorst
  Conrad Barnard
  Daniel (Neil) du Plessis
  Gert Muller
  Ross Skeate
  Conrad Stoltz
  Kirill Kulemin
  Viliamu Afatia
  François Tardieu
  Lisiate Fa'aoso
  Uelini Fono
  Opeti Fonua
  Semisi Telefoni
  Inaki Basauri
  Kevin Swiryn
  Luke Hamilton
  Jamie Robinson

See also
 List of rugby union clubs in France
 Rugby union in France

References

External links
  SU Agen Lot et Garonne Official website
  SU-Agen Unofficial website

 
Agen
Rugby clubs established in 1908
Sport in Agen
1908 establishments in France